Diese Kaminskis is  a German television series starring Nick Hein as part of a trio of three incompetent brothers who run a funeral parlour.

Background

The shows premise is a parody of the docu-soaps by television shows.  It was broadcast as part of the television program TVLab.

Storyline 
The three half-brothers Bernd, Michael and Marco Kaminski are absolute slobs and could not be more different. The nervous Bernd is plagued by neuroses, Michael is shy and naive and Marco is a party-obsessed fool. In addition, Marco's girlfriend Sandy, a tanned not very profound blonde. Together they take over a run-down funeral home in Cologne for lack of alternative job offers. Unfortunately, they are absolute amateurs in this business and get from one disaster to the next, but do not lose their self-confidence and chaotic creativity. Under the motto "Show me someone who doesn't die!" they take care of their clientele more or less reverently.

Cast
Peter Bronsema - Peter Mettmann
Nick Hein - Marco Kaminski
Kimberly Michel - Sandy
David Scheller - Michael Kaminski
Steffen Will - Bernd Kaminski

Episode list

References

External links 
 

2013 German television series debuts
2014 German television series endings
ZDF original programming
German-language television shows
German television sitcoms
Mockumentary television series